Rathdrum is a village in County Wicklow, Ireland. It is situated high on the western side of the Avonmore river valley, which flows through the Vale of Clara.

Transport

Railway
Rathdrum is served by mainline train and bus from Dublin and Rosslare. Rathdrum railway station opened on 18 July 1863, replacing the earlier terminus at Rathdrum (Kilcommon) (opened on 20 August 1861) when the line was extended.

Bus
Bus Éireann route 133 from Wicklow to Arklow serves Rathdrum twice a day each way (once each way on Sundays) and provides a link to Avoca, Woodenbridge, Glenealy and Rathnew.

The Wicklow Way bus service operates two routes linking Rathdrum railway station and Rathdrum with Glendalough and Tinahely respectively.

Politics and government

Rathdrum is part of the Wicklow constituency for national elections and referendums, and the South European Parliament constituency for European elections.

Rathdrum is the location of the Honorary Consulate of Belarus in Ireland.

People
Born in Rathdrum:
Anne Devlin (1780–1851), Irish republican and housekeeper to Robert Emmet.
Patrick Moran, First Roman Catholic Bishop of Dunedin, New Zealand.
Charles Stewart Parnell, nationalist politician once dubbed the "uncrowned king of Ireland" was born at nearby Avondale House. This house is now open to the public and situated in Avondale Forest park.

Notable residents:
Hazel O'Connor, English singer-songwriter and actress.

See also 
List of towns and villages in Ireland
Clara Lara FunPark, located nearby

References

External links

Towns and villages in County Wicklow